Kruttsy is a rural locality (a village) in Ilkinskoye Rural Settlement, Melenkovsky District, Vladimir Oblast, Russia. The population was 372 as of 2010. There are 4 streets.

Geography 
Kruttsy is located on the Unzha River, 10 km south of Melenki (the district's administrative centre) by road. Voynovo is the nearest rural locality.

References 

Rural localities in Melenkovsky District